Paul Steven Zollo (born August 9, 1958) is a singer, songwriter, author, journalist and photographer.

Paul Zollo is a songwriter, singer, recording artist for Trough Records, author of many books, photographer, and music journalist. He is presently the Senior Editor of American Songwriter magazine.

The books he's written include "Songwriters On Songwriting," "More Songwriters On Songwriting," "Conversations with Tom Petty, Expanded Edition," and "Hollywood Remembered."

The leader of the L.A. band The Ghosters, with whom he made one self-titled album of his original songs in 1984, he's made two solo albums, Orange Avenue and Universal Cure.

He has written songs with many songwriters and artists, including Darryl Purpose, Steve Allen, Dan Bern, Bob Malone, Stephen Kalinich, and Severin Browne.

Journalist 

Zollo was the editor of SongTalk magazine for many years, and went on to become Senior Editor of American Songwriter magazine and Managing Editor of Performing Songwriter magazine. He has also contributed articles to many magazines including Variety, Billboard, Rolling Stone, Musician, Oxford Press, Playback, Gorgeous, Boulevard, Music Connection, and Campus Circle.

Personal life 

His father, Burt Zollo, was also a writer, the author of three books (The Dollars & Sense of Public Relations [McGraw Hill], Prisoners, A Novel [Chicago Academy Press], and State & Wacker, A Novel [iUniverse]) and many magazine essays and articles. A former colleague of Hugh Hefner at Esquire magazine, he contributed to the first issues of Playboy magazine, including the inaugural Marilyn Monroe issue, under the pseudonym "Bob Norman".

He has one son, Joshua Zollo, who is 22. Joshua graduated this year from CSUN, and is a full-timeproducer of the podcast Your Mom's House with Tom Segura, a job started as an intern.

Paul Zollo currently lives and works in Los Angeles, and lives in the heart of Beverly Glen.

Bibliography 

The Beginning Songwriter's Answer Book (1990)
Songwriters on Songwriting
Songwriters on Songwriting (Expanded Edition) (2003)
 Hollywood Remembered (An Oral History of Its Golden Age) (2002)
Conversations with Tom Petty (2005)
Sunset & Cahuenga (A Novel)
The Schirmer's Complete Rhyming Dictionary. (2007)
More Songwriters on Songwriting (2016)
''Conversations with Tom Petty', Expanded Edition' (2020)

References

External links 
Paul Zollo on Flickr
Zollo on Instagram *
Zollo's own website, Bluerailtoad: *online magazine bluerailroad.com

Living people
Singers from Chicago
American photographers
American male journalists
Writers from Chicago
1958 births
Singer-songwriters from Illinois